Achterneed railway station was a railway station serving Strathpeffer and located on the Kyle of Lochalsh Line, in Wester Ross, Scotland.

History 

Opened in 1870, the station was sited two miles NNE of Strathpeffer between Dingwall and Garve. It was initially named Strathpeffer but the name was changed to avoid passenger confusion when the branch line to that town from Dingwall opened in 1885.

The station was opened by the Dingwall and Skye Railway, but operated from the outset by the Highland Railway. 

On 25 September 1897 a mixed passenger and goods train from Dingwall to Strome Ferry was approaching the summit of the line at Raven's Rock, just west of Achterneed station, when the coupling broke between the 5th and 6th vehicles and the 10 rear vehicles of the train ran backwards for a distance of 6 miles, coming to a halt just before the junction with the main line at Dingwall. The station master at Achterneed noticed the runaway train, and sent notice to Dingwall. The signalman at Dingwall managed to alert two intermediate level crossings. The crossing keeper at the first location was away from her house and the crossing gates were smashed. The keeper at the second location managed to close her gates and prevent any damage. 

The station was taken into the London, Midland and Scottish Railway during the Grouping of 1923, the line then passed on to the Scottish Region of British Railways on nationalisation in 1948.

The station was closed by the British Railways Board in 1965.

Stationmasters

W. Garrow until 1874 (afterwards station master at Garve)
Donald Mackenzie 1874 - 1876 (afterwards station master at Dalwhinnie)
Peter Longmore from 1876 
Mr Butter until 1890 (afterwards station master at Helmsdale)
Donald Fraser from 1890 (formerly station master at Helmsdale)
Mr. McLennan ca. 1903
Alexander Wright from 1907

References

Notes

Sources 
 
 
 
 Station on navigable O.S. map

External links 

Disused railway stations in Highland (council area)
Former Highland Railway stations
Railway stations in Great Britain opened in 1870
Railway stations in Great Britain closed in 1965
Beeching closures in Scotland